Shendurni is the Municipal council in district of Jalgaon, Maharashtra.

History
The Shendurni municipal council established on 15-Jun-2016.

Municipal Council election

Electoral performance 2018

References 

Municipal councils in Maharashtra